was the second of ten s, and the first to be built for the Imperial Japanese Navy under the Circle One Program (Maru Ichi Keikaku). Along with the destroyer , she developed a reputation within the Imperial Japanese Navy for being "lucky" or "unsinkable",  emerging undamaged from several battles and as the sole surviving Japanese warship from two.  As the flagship of Captain Tameichi Hara's Destroyer Division 27 Shigure received a prominent place in the memoirs of the only Japanese destroyer captain to survive the entire Pacific War.  Shigure was torpedoed and sunk by the submarine  in the Gulf of Siam on 24 January 1945.

History
Despite being one of the most powerful classes of destroyers in the world at the time of their completion, none survived the Pacific War.

Shigure, built at the Uraga Dock Company was laid down on 9 December 1933, launched on 18 May 1935 and commissioned on 7 September 1936.

Operational history
At the time of the attack on Pearl Harbor, Shigure was assigned to Destroyer Division 27 of Destroyer Squadron 1 of the IJN 1st Fleet on anti-submarine warfare patrols in Japanese home waters and to assist in guarding Japan’s main battle fleet. At the Battle of the Coral Sea on 7 May, Shigure was part of the escort for Admiral Takeo Takagi’s Strike Force and at the Battle of Midway on 4–6 June, she was part of the Aleutians Guard Force under Admiral Shirō Takasu. Shigure was reassigned to the IJN 2nd Fleet on 14 July after the Midway Operation was cancelled. In mid-August, Shigure escorted the fleet to Truk, and was then assigned to cover a troop transport run to reoccupy Makin Atoll after the Makin Raid. Based out of Jaluit in September, Shigure helped secure Abemama in the Gilbert Islands and Ndeni in the Santa Cruz Islands, before escorting a troop convoy from Palau to Rabaul on 24 September. In October and November, she made eight "Tokyo Express" troop transport runs to Guadalcanal. In the First Naval Battle of Guadalcanal on the night of 12–13 November 1942 she was part of the distant screening force and saw no combat, but later rescued survivors of the battleship . At the end of the year, she escorted the aircraft carrier  from Truk to Yokosuka and  back to Truk.

In mid-January 1943, Shigure escorted a troop convoy from Truk to Shortlands, and was later assigned to "Operation KE", to cover troop evacuations from Guadalcanal. She returned to Sasebo in mid-February for repairs. In mid-May, she escorted the battleship  from Truk to Yokosuka, returning to Truk by 21 June. In July, she was assigned to accompany the cruiser  on various assignments around the Solomon Islands, and was reassigned to the IJN 2nd Fleet on 20 July. She made a "Tokyo Express" troop transport run to Rekata Bay on 27 July, and to Kolombangara on 1 August.

During the Battle of Vella Gulf of 6–7 August, Shigure was the only one of four Japanese destroyers to escape, though she was later found to have been hit by a torpedo that failed to explode. During the Battle off Horaniu on 17–18 August, she again engaged United States Navy destroyers without damage while covering a troop transport mission to Vella Lavella. At the end of August, she made two troop evacuation runs to Rekata Bay, one of which was aborted, and one mission to Tuluvu and to Buka, Papua New Guinea in September. She further covered two troop evacuation missions to Kolombangara at the end of September and early October. She was covering troop evacuations at Vella Lavella during the 6–7 October Battle of Vella Lavella, and contributed to massive damage to the destroyer . For the remainder of October, she participated in four more transport runs to points in New Guinea. At the Battle of Empress Augusta Bay on 2 November, she engaged an American cruiser-destroyer formation, but without damage. After making a final troop transport mission to Buka on 6 November, she escorted a convoy from Rabaul to Truk, rescuing 70 survivors of the transport Tokyo Maru en route on 10 November. She returned to Sasebo in mid-November for repairs. Departing Sasebo on 24 December, she collided with a fishing boat in Bungo Strait, and was forced to return again to Sasebo for further repairs.

In January 1944, Shigure escorted the food supply ship  from Yokosuka to Truk, and in early February escorted tanker convoys from Truk to Tarakan and Balikpapan. She suffered heavy damage in an air raid on Truk by United States Navy aircraft, taking a direct bomb hit to her No.2 gun turret, killing 21 crewmen and wounding 45 others. She was withdrawn to Palau for emergency repairs, and returned to Sasebo on 22 March, where her damaged turret was removed and replaced by two triple Type 96 anti-aircraft gun mounts. In June she was assigned to “Operation KON”, (the reinforcement of Biak), in response to American landings. She rescued 110 survivors from the destroyer  on 8 June, and then engaged in combat against a group of Allied cruisers and destroyers, taking two shell hits, which killed seven crewmen and wounded 15 others. From 19–20 June, Shigure was at the Battle of the Philippine Sea as part of Admiral Takatsugu Jōjima’s “Force B”, and assisted in the rescue of survivors from the aircraft carrier . In July, she was assigned to escort a troop convoy from Kure to Okinawa, and in August accompanied the  cruiser  on a transport mission from Singapore to Brunei, Manila and Palau, returning via Cebu. In October, Shigure sortied from Lingga and Brunei and was at the Battle of Leyte Gulf on 22–25 October. She took minor damage from a direct bomb hit to her forward gun turret on 24 October, killing five crewmen and wounding six. She took further damage in the Battle of Surigao Strait in which a direct shell hit and several near misses took out her radio, compass, and steering, but she was the only ship of the “Southern Force” to survive the battle, and limped back to Brunei on 27 October. She was reassigned to the IJN 5th Fleet on 15 November and the IJN 2nd Fleet on 20 November, departing Kure on 17 December with the aircraft carrier  for Manila. After Unryū was sunk by the submarine , Shigure and the destroyer  rescued the 146 survivors.

She sank slowly, allowing for 270 survivors to escape, with 37 crewmen lost. Shigure was removed from the navy list on 10 March 1945.

Notes

References 

  (2011 edition)

 OCLC 77257764

External links

Detailed account of Shigure's escort mission with Unryu

Shiratsuyu class destroyers
World War II destroyers of Japan
Shipwrecks in the Gulf of Thailand
World War II shipwrecks in the South China Sea
Maritime incidents in January 1945
Ships sunk by American submarines
1935 ships
Ships built by Uraga Dock Company